Omorgus frater is a species of hide beetle in the subfamily Omorginae and subgenus Afromorgus.

References

frater
Beetles described in 2005